Michael Angold (born 1940) is Professor Emeritus of Byzantine History and Honorary Fellow in the University of Edinburgh.

Biography
Michael Angold was educated at the University of Oxford (BA, D.Phil.). He has worked at the University of Edinburgh from 1970, serving as professor of Byzantine history from 1996 until 2005, when he was appointed professor emeritus.

He has worked in the fields of medieval and Renaissance history and is especially known for his contribution to Byzantine Studies. He has been particularly dedicated to the study of the Comnenian period and of the late Eastern Orthodox Church in the Byzantine Empire.

He has been a member of the British National Committee of the Association Internationale pour les Études Byzantines and of the Byzantine Studies panel of the Research Assessment Exercise.

He is a Fellow of the Royal Historical Society.

To mark his retirement the University of Edinburgh held a conference, Ethnonemesis: the creation and disappearance of ethnic identities in the medieval East and West (3–5 June 2005). The keynote speaker was Dr Susan Reynolds, Emeritus Fellow of Lady Margaret Hall, Oxford, and other speakers included nineteen academics from the Universities of Cardiff, Durham, Edinburgh, London, St Andrews, and Wisconsin–Madison, The Queen's University of Belfast, King's College London, and the Institut für Mittelalterforschung, Österreichische Akademie der Wissenschaften (Institute for Medieval Studies, Austrian Academy of Sciences), which co-sponsored the conference with the Medieval and Early Renaissance Studies Programme, University of Edinburgh.

Publications

Books as author
A Byzantine Government in Exile: Government and Society under the Laskarids of Nicaea, 1204-1261 (London: Oxford University Press, 1975)
The Byzantine Empire, 1025-1204: a Political History (London: Longman, 1984; 2nd edn, New York: Longman, 1997)
Church and Society in Byzantium under the Comneni, 1081-1261 (Cambridge: Cambridge University Press, 1995)
Byzantium: the Bridge from Antiquity to the Middle Ages (London: Weidenfeld & Nicolson, 2001; London: Phoenix, 2002)
The Fourth Crusade: Event and Context (Harlow: Longman, 2003)
The Fall of Constantinople to the Ottomans (Pearson, 2012). Greek edition Η Άλωση της Κωνσταντινούπολης από τους Οθωμανούς (Κριτική, 2013)

Articles as author
'Procopius' portrait of Theodora', in C.N. Constantinides, N.M. Panagiotakes, E. Jeffreys, and A.D. Angelou, eds., Studies in Honour of Robert Browning (Venice: Istituto ellenico di studi bizantini e postbizantini di Venezia, 1996), pp. 21–34

Thesis
The Administration of the Nicaean Empire (1204-1261) (D.Phil. thesis, University of Oxford, 1967)

Books as editor
The Byzantine aristocracy, IX to XIII centuries (BAR International Series 221, Oxford: BAR, 1984)
Eastern Christianity (Cambridge: Cambridge University Press, 2006)

Bibliographer
Michael Angold was formerly responsible for producing a bibliography of publications in English for the Byzantinische Zeitschrift.

References
Michael Angold, Byzantium: the Bridge from Antiquity to the Middle Ages (London: Phoenix, 2002), p. i
University of Edinburgh, Senatus, Special Minute (7 December 2005)

Alumni of the University of Oxford
Religious studies scholars
People from Oxford
Living people
1940 births
English classical scholars
Academics of the University of Edinburgh
Fellows of the Royal Historical Society
Historians of the Crusades
British Byzantinists
Scholars of Byzantine history